William James Grahame (July 22, 1884 in Owosso, Michigan – February 15, 1936 in Holt, Michigan), was a professional baseball player who played pitcher in the Major Leagues in -. He would play for the St. Louis Browns.

External links

1884 births
1936 deaths
Major League Baseball pitchers
Baseball players from Michigan
St. Louis Browns players
Grand Rapids Wolverines players
Shreveport Pirates (baseball) players
Chattanooga Lookouts players
Rome Romans players
People from Owosso, Michigan
People from Holt, Michigan